Tårnby is a town in Denmark, the seat of Tårnby Municipality in the Capital Region of Denmark. Neighbouring settlements include the Copenhagen suburb of Sundbyvester to the north and Kastrup to the south. Copenhagen Airport is situated to the east of Tårnby. It includes the islets Saltholm and Peberholm.

History
There's no clear date for the founding of Tårnby, but archaeological expeditions prior to the building of the Øresund Bridge suggest that the first traces of Tårnby originated around the 12th century around a farm from which the village grew.

In the 16th century, Danish King Christian II invited Dutch settlers to Amager. That made Tårnby, like the neighbouring city of Dragør, also have some traces of Dutch history and culture.

In 1970, Tårnby also became the administrative division of the adjacent city of Kastrup, as part of a larger reform of the Danish counties.

Geography
The town is situated in the island of Amager, close to Dragør, in the southern suburbs of Copenhagen and is part of the capital's urban area. The terrain is quite flat and doesn't rise more than 8 meters (appr. 26 feet) above sea level. Tårnby also incorporates the islands of Saltholm and Peberholm, natural and artificial respectively, both situated in the Øresund Strait.

While Tårnby has a history of farming, it has been almost completely urbanised, leaving only small traces of farmland in the southernmost parts. The westernmost part of the municipality contains Amager Fælled, a protected wildlife and recreational area. As such, the area is primarily used for birdwatching and various recreational activities. However, in recent years urban development have limited the area significantly.

Notable people 

 Carl Alstrup (1877 in Sundbyvester – 1942) a Danish actor and film director 
 Rakel Helmsdal (born 1966) a Faroese writer and involved in youth theatre
 Martin Henriksen (born 1980) a Danish politician and former MP
 Peter Hummelgaard Thomsen (born 1983) a Danish politician and Minister of Employment since 2019.
 Maria Apetri (born 1985) stage name Fallulah, a Danish singer-songwriter and musician
 Morten Ristorp (born 1986), stage name Rissi, is a Danish-born American producer, composer, songwriter and musician

Sport 
 Jan Heintze (born 1963) a retired Danish footballer with 564 club caps and 86 for Denmark
 Angelina Jensen (born 1973) a Danish curler
 Niki Zimling (born 1985) a retired Danish footballer with over 250 club caps and 24 for Denmark and currently the sporting director of Kolding IF
 Mads Glæsner (born 1988) a Danish freestyle swimmer, participated at the 2008 and 2012 Summer Olympics

See also
Tårnby station

References

External links

Municipal seats in the Capital Region of Denmark
Municipal seats of Denmark
Copenhagen metropolitan area
Cities and towns in the Capital Region of Denmark
Tårnby Municipality